Sakuradai Station (桜台駅) is the name of two train stations in Japan:

Sakuradai Station (Fukuoka)
 Sakuradai Station (Tokyo)